Michelle Bowrey (born 12 July 1970) is a retired professional female tennis player from Australia who competed on the WTA Tour.  She competed in the Australian Open three times and attained a career-high ranking of #233 in January 1989.

Bowrey is the daughter of two-time French Open champion Lesley Turner Bowrey and 1968 Australian Open winner Bill Bowrey.

ITF Circuit finals

Singles (0–3)

Doubles (1–2)

References

External links 
 
 

1970 births
Australian female tennis players
Place of birth missing (living people)
Living people
Tennis people from New South Wales